Radoslav Augustín (born 5 January 1987) is a Slovak football midfielder who currently plays for SV Gols.

1. FC Tatran Prešov
In winter 2013, Augustín joined Slovak side Tatran Prešov on a one-year loan from ŠK Slovan Bratislava.

External links
FC Petržalka 1898 profile

References

1987 births
Living people
Footballers from Bratislava
Slovak footballers
Association football midfielders
FK Inter Bratislava players
Bohemians 1905 players
Union Royale Namur Fosses-La-Ville players
FC Senec players
FC Petržalka players
ŠK Slovan Bratislava players
FK Dukla Banská Bystrica players
1. FC Tatran Prešov players
ŠK Senec players
FC Nitra players
Slovak Super Liga players
Expatriate footballers in Belgium
Expatriate footballers in the Czech Republic